American Spirit is a 65-foot gaff-rigged, steel-hulled schooner. She is owned and operated by the National Maritime Heritage Foundation in Washington, D.C. and is used as a "floating classroom" for teaching District of Columbia-area students about sailing and maritime history. American Spirit is also used for excursion cruises and private charters.

Freya
The schooner was built on Cape Cod in 1991 by Steve Eldridge to designs by Frank Meigs of Brewster, Massachusetts. Meigs and his wife, Elaine, named the schooner Freya (the second vessel they owned by that name) and sailed her out of Sesuit Harbor (East Dennis, MA) and Islamorada (FL). as a charter vessel until she was listed for sale in the spring of 2003.

See also
List of historical schooners

References

External links

1991 ships
Individual sailing vessels
Schooners of the United States
Ships built in Massachusetts
District of Columbia-related ships
Sail training ships